L'eau d'Issey is a perfume for women produced for Japanese fashion designer Issey Miyake. 

"L'eau d'Issey" means "the water of Issey" in French. It was introduced in 1992. The "nose" for the perfume was Jacques Cavallier.

The fragrance is an aquatic floral, with top notes of Lotus, Melon, and Freesia, and a woody white musk base.

A flanker fragrance for men "L'eau d'Issey Pour Homme" was introduced in 1994 by Issey Miyake Parfums.

References

External links
 L'eau d'Issey from Basenotes
 L'eau d'Issey Pour Homme from Basenotes

Perfumes
Japanese fashion
Products introduced in 1992
Products introduced in 1994